Bi Bi Gol Mordeh may refer to:
 Bi Bi Gol Mordeh-ye Olya
 Bi Bi Gol Mordeh-ye Sofla